The Arakkonam Junction–Jolarpettai Junction Express is an Express train belonging to Southern Railway zone that runs between  and  in India. It is currently being operated with 16085/16086 train numbers on a daily basis.

Service
The 16085 / Arakkonam Junction–Jolarpettai Junction Express has an average speed of 46 km/hr and covers 145 km in 3h 10m. The 16086 / Jolarpettai Junction–Arakkonam Junction Express has an average speed of 51 km/hr and covers 145 km in 2h 50m.

Route and halts 
The important halts of the train are:

Coach composition
The train has standard ICF rakes with a max speed of 110 kmph. The train consists of 12 coaches:

 10 General Unreserved
 2 Seating cum Luggage Rake

See also 
The train shares its rake with 66008/66009 Local Moore Market Complex–Arakkonam MEMU

Notes

See also 
 Rangiya Junction railway station
 New Tinsukia Junction railway station
 Moore Market Complex–Arakkonam MEMU

References

External links 
 16085/Arakkonam–Jolarpettai Express India Rail Info
 16086/Jolarpettai–Arakkonam Express India Rail Info

Express trains in India
Rail transport in Tamil Nadu